Jérôme Le Moigne (born 15 February 1983) is a French former professional footballer who played as a midfielder.

Career
In July 2017, Le Moigne joined French fourth-tier side Bastia-Borgo.

References

External links

 

1983 births
Living people
Association football midfielders
French footballers
Ligue 1 players
Ligue 2 players
AS Cannes players
SC Toulon players
CS Sedan Ardennes players
RC Lens players
Gazélec Ajaccio players
FC Bastia-Borgo players